Dolichoderus lucidus is an extinct species of Eocene ant in the genus Dolichoderus. Described by Dlussky in 2008, the fossils of the species were found in the Rovno amber in Ukraine.

References

†
Eocene insects
Prehistoric insects of Europe
Fossil taxa described in 2008
Fossil ant taxa
Rovno amber